In mathematics, the Gan–Gross–Prasad conjecture is a restriction problem in the representation theory of real or p-adic Lie groups posed by Gan Wee Teck, Benedict Gross, and Dipendra Prasad. The problem originated from a conjecture of Gross and Prasad for special orthogonal groups but was later generalized to include all four classical groups. In the cases considered, it is known that the multiplicity of the restrictions is at most one
and the conjecture describes when the multiplicity is precisely one.

Motivation
A motivating example is the following classical branching problem in the theory of compact Lie groups. Let  be an irreducible finite dimensional representation of the compact unitary group , and consider its restriction to the naturally embedded subgroup . It is known that this restriction is multiplicity-free, but one may ask precisely which irreducible representations of  occur in the restriction.

By the Cartan–Weyl theory of highest weights, there is a classification of the irreducible representations of  via their highest weights which are in natural bijection with sequences of integers .
Now suppose that  has highest weight .

The Gan–Gross–Prasad conjecture then considers the analogous restriction problem for other classical groups.

Statement
The conjecture has slightly different forms for the different classical groups. The formulation for unitary groups is as follows.

Setup
Let  be a finite-dimensional vector space over a field  not of characteristic  equipped with a non-degenerate sesquilinear form that is -Hermitian (i.e.  if the form is Hermitian and  if the form is skew-Hermitian).

Local Gan–Gross–Prasad conjecture

Letting  be the "distinguished character" defined in terms of the Langlands–Deligne local constant, then furthermore

Global Gan–Gross–Prasad conjecture
For a quadratic field extension , let  where  is the global L-function obtained as the product of local L-factors given by the local Langlands conjectures.
The conjecture states that the following are equivalent:

Current status

Local Gan–Gross–Prasad conjecture
In a series of four papers between 2010 and 2012, Jean-Loup Waldspurger proved the local Gan–Gross–Prasad conjecture for tempered representations of special orthogonal groups over p-adic fields. In 2012, Colette Moeglin and Waldspurger then proved the local Gan–Gross–Prasad conjecture for generic non-tempered representations of special orthogonal groups over p-adic fields.

In his 2013 thesis, Raphaël Beuzart-Plessis proved the local Gan–Gross–Prasad conjecture for the tempered representations of unitary groups in the p-adic Hermitian case under the same hypotheses needed to establish the local Langlands conjecture.

Hongyu He proved the Gan-Gross-Prasad conjectures for discrete series representations of the real unitary group U(p,q).

Global Gan–Gross–Prasad conjecture
In a series of papers between 2004 and 2009, David Ginzburg, Dihua Jiang, and Stephen Rallis showed the (1) implies (2) direction of the global Gan–Gross–Prasad conjecture for all quasisplit classical groups.

In the Bessel case of the global Gan–Gross–Prasad conjecture for unitary groups,  Wei Zhang used the theory of the relative trace formula by Hervé Jacquet and the work on the fundamental lemma by Zhiwei Yun to prove that the conjecture is true subject to certain local conditions in 2014.

In the Fourier–Jacobi case of the global Gan–Gross–Prasad conjecture for unitary groups, Yifeng Liu and Hang Xue showed that the conjecture holds in the skew-Hermitian case, subject to certain local conditions.

In the Bessel case of the global Gan–Gross–Prasad conjecture for special orthogonal groups and unitary groups, Dihua Jiang and Lei Zhang used the theory of twisted automorphic descents to prove that (1) implies (2) in its full generality, i.e. for any irreducible cuspidal automorphic representation with a generic global Arthur parameter, and that (2) implies (1) subject to a certain global assumption.

References

Automorphic forms
Conjectures
Number theory
Langlands program
Representation theory of Lie groups
Representation theory of groups
Zeta and L-functions